= Ernestine Spitzer =

Austrian fashion businessperson

Ernestine Spitzer (22 April 1836 – 13 March 1897) was an Austrian fashion businessperson. She was the founder of the fashion house G. & E. Spitzer in Vienna.
